The 2010–11 season was Portsmouth's first season in the EFL Championship after relegation from the Premier League at the end of the previous season.

Season review
On 22 October, Portsmouth issued a statement declaring "it appears likely that the club will now be closed down and liquidated by the administrators", but Pompey creditor Alexandre Gaydamak announced the next day that he had reached an agreement that could save their future. It was revealed just hours later that Portsmouth had finally come out of administration.

Players

First-team squad
Squad at end of season

Left club during season

Transfers
Portsmouth had previously stated that any contracts due to expire at the end of the 2009–10 season would not be renewed due to their financial problems, and that they hoped to sign a new squad on free transfers and sell their squad from last year. As it transpired, only five players were released, on 19 May 2010; ten others were offered new contracts.

In
Since Portsmouth were under a transfer embargo, they initially were not allowed to buy players or sign free agents as they could not guarantee the PFA that the wages for the players could be paid. The embargo was later lifted.

Out

Player statistics

Squad statistics
Last updated on 7 May 2011.

|}

Disciplinary recordsLast updated on 7 May 2011.''

Competition

Championship

Results summary

Results by round

Championship

League Cup

FA Cup

Notes

References

External links
Official Website

Portsmouth F.C. seasons
Portsmouth